Ivan Ivanov (Bulgarian: Иван Иванов; born 7 April 2000) is a Bulgarian singer and songwriter.

Life and work
Ivan Ivanov was born on 7 April 2000 in Gorna Oryahovitsa, a small town in northeastern Bulgaria.  Ivanov first became interested in music when he was 7 years old, but started to sing at the age of 8.

His very first single "Kurazh" (My courage) was released in June 2009, in which he rose to fame.

2010–present
He released his first "mature" single (his second original hit single) in January 2010, titled "Po-trudno" (Harder).

He released his third single "Tova Ne e Taka" (It's not so") in August 2010.

Ivanov represented Bulgaria in the Junior Eurovision Song Contest 2011 in Yerevan, Armenia on 3 December with his song "Supergeroy" (Superhero), placing 8th with a total of 60 points.

He commentated on the live stream of Junior Eurovision Song Contest 2015 on JuniorEurovision.tv alongside the website's editor Luke Fisher.

Discography

Singles

References

External links
 

2000 births
Living people
People from Gorna Oryahovitsa
Junior Eurovision Song Contest entrants
21st-century Bulgarian male singers
Bulgarian child singers